North Bon Air is a neighborhood within the city limits of Tampa, Florida, USA. As of the 2010 census the neighborhood had a population of 1,098. The ZIP Codes serving the area are 33607 and 33609.

Geography
North Bon Air boundaries are Dale Mabry Highway to the east, Westshore Palms to the west, Kennedy Boulevard Boulevard to the south, and Interstate 275 to the north.

Demographics
Source: Hillsborough County Atlas

At the 2010 census there were 1,098 people and 465 households residing in the neighborhood. The population density was 4,037/mi2. The racial makeup of the neighborhood was 78.0% White, 11.0% African American, 0.0% Native American, 2.0% Asian, 4.0% from other races, and 5.0% from two or more races. Hispanic or Latino of any race were about 45.0%.

Of the 465 households 19% had children under the age of 18 living with them, 39% were married couples living together, 16% had a female householder with no husband present, and 11% non-families. 29% of households were made up of individuals.

The age distribution was 15% under the age of 18, 23% from 18 to 34, 22% from 35 to 49, 20% from 50 to 64, and 18% 65 or older. For every 100 females, there were 99.1 males.

The per capita income for the neighborhood was $24,095. About 9% of the population were below the poverty line. Of those, 33% are under age 18.

See also
Neighborhoods in Tampa, Florida

References

External links
North Bon Air Neighborhood Association

Neighborhoods in Tampa, Florida